Kelly Haimona (born 30 July 1986) is an Italian international rugby union player, who can play Fly Half, Centre and Fullback. He currently plays for Italian side Zebre in the Pro14 competition.

Career

New Zealand
Haimona's rugby career began in 2005, playing for his local club Whakarewarewa in the Baywide Premier Rugby competition. In 2006, he helped his team to become champions of the Baywide Premier Rugby competition, scoring a try and kicking a crucial penalty to beat Rotoiti 18–17. His passion for the team saw Kelly become captain for a number of seasons, and in 2007, he was named in the Bay of Plenty squad for the 2007 Air New Zealand Cup. Within weeks of joining the squad, he was promoted into the region's top squad for the rest of the competition, following injury to regular Number 10 Murray Williams. He made his Bay of Plenty debut off the bench on 25 August 2007 against Otago. He was reselected for Bay of Plenty again in 2008, but struggled for game time during the season. After his brief stint with the Steamers, he continued to play with Whakarewarewa until 2011, where he was targeted by the Italian national team selectors. However, that would mean he would have to play in Italy for 3 consecutive years to earn player residency.

Italy
Haimona's Italian career began in late 2011, playing for Lyons Piacenza in the Serie A championship - the second tier of the Italian Rugby Union championships. He consistently started and played well at Fly-half for Lyons, and for many seasons, there were a lot of interest in him from championships above Serie A. However, it wasn't until early 2013 that Calvisano had a look at him and signed him for the 2013-14 National Championship of Excellence (NCE). He made his Calvisano debut on 21 September 2013 in a 36–0 victory over San Donà. He played in every match that season for Calvisano, being their first choice Fly-Half in all their 2013–14 European Challenge Cup matches - though Calvisano failed to win any matches in their pool, made up of; Brive, Newcastle Falcons and București Wolves. At best, they secured a 20–all draw with Brive in the opening match. His form in the NCE caught the eyes Zebre, who had loaned Haimona in February and March 2014 from Calvisano. His first match was a starting position at Fly-half against Irish side Leinster, who were 31–8 victors on that occasion. However, he was vital in Zebre's 15–10 win over Cardiff Blues.

On 26 August 2014, Haimona was officially announced in Zebre's squad for the 2014–15 Pro12 season. On 27 September, Zebre beat Ulster 13–6, and during this match Haimona scored a 40-meter drop goal to help Zebre secure an historic victory.

On 8 October, after three years in the waiting, Kelly Haimona was named in the Italian National team for their 2014 end-of-year tests against Samoa, Argentina and South Africa. He made his debut in the opening match against Samoa on 8 November 2014. He kicked 14 points in the 24–13 win, Italy's first win in 9 attempts.

References

External links
 
 Zebre profile

1986 births
Living people
Italian rugby union players
New Zealand rugby union players
Bay of Plenty rugby union players
Zebre Parma players
Rugby Calvisano players
Rugby union fly-halves
Rugby union centres
Rugby union fullbacks
Italy international rugby union players
People educated at Rotorua Boys' High School
New Zealand emigrants to Italy
Rugby union players from Rotorua